Binger is a German and Danish surname. Notable people with the surname include:

Carl Binger (1889–1976), American psychiatrist
James H. Binger (1916–2004), American lawyer and chief executive
Louis Gustave Binger (1856–1936), French explorer
Maurits Binger (1868–1923), Dutch film director, producer and screenwriter
Michael Binger (born 1976), American poker player
Ray Binger (1888–1970), American cinematographer
Thomas Binger, American lawyer and government official

See also
Pinge (surname) 
Binge (disambiguation)
Bing (disambiguation)
Pinger (disambiguation)
Dinger (disambiguation)

German-language surnames
Danish-language surnames

de:Binger